KLSV may refer to:

 KLSV-LD, a low-power television station (channel 21, virtual 50) licensed to Las Vegas, Nevada, United States
 the ICAO code for Nellis Air Force Base